USS Caelum (AK-106) was a  commissioned by the US Navy for service in World War II. Caelum was named after the constellation Caelum. She was responsible for delivering troops, goods and equipment to locations in the Asiatic-Pacific Theater.

Construction
Caelum was laid down 30 June 1943, under Maritime Commission (MARCOM) contract, MC hull No. 1860, as the Liberty ship SS Wyatt Earp, by California Shipbuilding Corporation, Terminal Island, Los Angeles, California; launched 25 July 1943; sponsored by Mrs. H. N. MacKusick; transferred to the Navy 10 August 1943; commissioned 22 October 1943 and reported to the US Pacific Fleet.

Service history
Assigned to the Pacific Fleet, Caelum carried cargo between Pearl Harbor and Tarawa, Majuro, Eniwetok, Kwajalein, and Ulithi, in her first year of service. Her tireless operations included participation in the occupation of Kwajalein and Majuro in February 1944, and from June through October 1944, she was assigned to Service Squadron 10.

Supporting invasion forces 
A San Francisco overhaul late in 1944, was followed by Caelums assignment from 20 January 1945, as station ship at Ulithi, and from 8 May, at Guam. At these bases she controlled and issued cargo and provisions to the ships which carried out the massive operations in the Palaus, Philippines, Iwo Jima, and Okinawa, and the task forces which pounded Japanese bases from the air.

End-of-war activity 
Returning to the States for overhaul in June and July 1945, Caelum towed  to Ulithi in August, and sailed on to support the occupation of Korea in September, and to provide logistic services to ships at Shanghai in early October. From 9 November, when she arrived at Samar, Philippine Islands, the cargo ship sailed from this and various Chinese ports until clearing for the United States 15 April 1946.

Post-war decommissioning
Decommissioned at Seattle, Washington on 30 July 1946, Caelum was returned to the Maritime Commission the next day. She was laid up in the National Defense Reserve Fleet, Olympia, Washington.

Fate
On 19 October 1961, she was sold to Hyman-Michaels Company, for $82,011.11, to be scrapped. Her scrapping was completed 2 January 1962, at National Steel and Shipbuilding Company (NASSCO).

Awards
Caelum received one battle star for World War II service.

Notes 

Citations

Bibliography 

Online resources

External links
 

Crater-class cargo ships
World War II auxiliary ships of the United States
Ships built in Los Angeles
1943 ships
Olympia Reserve Fleet